Johnny Bovang born Kristiansand, Norway, is a South African ballet dancer.
He trained at the Royal Ballet School, London and joined the PACT Ballet Company, which was based in Pretoria, in 1983. He moved to the Cape Town City Ballet in 1997. He danced at the inauguration of former South African president Nelson Mandela. He has performed as a guest artist in Tokyo, Glasgow and New Zealand. He is known for his partnerships of Janet Lindup, Leanne Voysey and Marianne Bauer. During his career, he has received many awards, including the DALRO, FNB Vita and the Nederburg awards. He received the Balletomane Award for best male dancer in 2004.

Notable roles

References

External links 
 City ballet dancers receive awards
 Johnny Bovang at Cape Town City Ballet

Living people
South African male ballet dancers
People educated at the Royal Ballet School
People from Kristiansand
Year of birth missing (living people)